Yulian Radulski (sometimes also transliterated as Julian Radulski or Yuliyan Radulski) (24 May 1972 – 16 February 2013), was a Bulgarian chess Grandmaster. Actively practicing chess since 1983 and attaining the GM title in 2004, he represented his country in Chess Olympiads and was the Bulgarian chess champion for 2011.

References

1972 births
2013 deaths
Chess players from Plovdiv
Chess grandmasters
Chess Olympiad competitors